Alberto "Tico" Carrero Tellado (born September 4, 1948) is a Puerto Rican former professional tennis player.

Carrero, a native of San Juan, represented Puerto Rico in the demonstration event at the 1968 Summer Olympics and was a quarter-finalist in doubles. He also represented the territory at the 1963 Pan American Games and 1966 Central American and Caribbean Games, earning a doubles silver medal in the latter.

From 1968 to 1971 he played collegiate tennis while studying civil engineering at Rice University.

References

External links
 
 

1948 births
Living people
Puerto Rican male tennis players
Rice Owls men's tennis players
Tennis players at the 1963 Pan American Games
Pan American Games competitors for Puerto Rico
Competitors at the 1966 Central American and Caribbean Games
Central American and Caribbean Games silver medalists for Puerto Rico
Central American and Caribbean Games medalists in tennis
Tennis players at the 1968 Summer Olympics
Sportspeople from San Juan, Puerto Rico
People from Santurce, Puerto Rico